The 2012/13 season of the Algerian Women's Volleyball League  was the 51st annual season of the country's highest volleyball level.

Members of the Algerian Women's Volleyball League (2012–13 season)

Regular season

|}

Round 1

|}

Round 2

|}

Round 3

|}

Round 4

|}

Round 5

|}

Round 6

|}

Round 7

|}

Round 8

|}

Round 9

|}

Round 10

|}

Round 11

|}

Round 12

|}

Round 13

|}

Round 14

|}

Round 15

|}

Round 16

|}

Round 17

|}

Round 18

|}

Semi-final

|}

|}

3rd place

|}

Final

|}

Play Down

|}

Round 1

|}

Round 2

|}

Round 3

|}

Round 4

|}

Round 5

|}

Awards

References

External links
 Algerian Women's Volleyball League 2012/2013
 Volleyball in Algeria

Volleyball competitions in Algeria
2012 in volleyball
2013 in volleyball
2012 in Algerian sport
2013 in Algerian sport
Women's volleyball in Algeria